96° in the Shade is the second album by the  Jamaican reggae group Third World, released by Island Records in 1977.

The title track, “1865 (96 Degrees in the Shade)”, refers to the year of the Morant Bay rebellion, headed by the Baptist deacon and preacher Paul Bogle. Although the rebellion failed, the song makes clear that Bogle’s actions reverberated across Jamaican history. The song has “simmering, rootsy beat, subtly infectious melody, lovely guitar work and potent lyrics.”

Reception
The album "was an enormous critical success in the U.K. and Europe, and spawned an all-time classic single in the title track," writes Steve Huey of AllMusic.

The album introduced two new band members, the new drummer Willie "Roots" Stewart and new lead singer William Clarke, aka Bunny Rugs.

Track listing
Track listing in Discogs:

Personnel
Third World
Bunny Rugs - vocals
Michael "Ibo" Cooper - keyboards
Steven "Cat" Coore - lead guitar
Irvin "Carrot" Jarrett - percussions
Richard "Richie" Daley - bass
Willie Stewart - drums
with:
Chris Wood - soprano saxophone on "Feel a Little Better"
Donald "Satta" Manning - chant on "Rhythm of Life"
Background noises on "Human Market Place" recorded at Coronation Market, Jamaica by Irvin "Carrot" Jarrett

Production
Produced by Third World.
Cover painting by Tony Wright.

References

Third World (band) albums
1977 albums
Island Records albums